Geoffrey Hewett Green (15 March 1901 – 21 April 1959) was an Australian politician.

He was born in Launceston. In 1946 he was elected to the Tasmanian Legislative Council as the independent member for Cambridge; however, Cambridge was transferred to Monmouth the same day and Green became Monmouth's MLC. He was elected President of the Council in 1955 and served until his death in Melbourne in 1959.

References

1901 births
1959 deaths
Independent members of the Parliament of Tasmania
Members of the Tasmanian Legislative Council
Presidents of the Tasmanian Legislative Council
20th-century Australian politicians